The 2000 WNBA season was their second in the league. The Miracle made to the playoffs for the first time in franchise history, only to lose to the Cleveland Rockers in three games.

Offseason

WNBA Draft

Roster

Season standings

Schedule

Preseason

|- align="center" bgcolor="bbffbb"
| 1
|  May 20
|  @ Indiana
| W 82-71
| N/A
| N/A
| N/A
| Mackey Arena
| 1-0
|- align="center" bgcolor="bbffbb"
| 2
|  May 24
|  New York
| W 83-81
| N/A
| N/A
| N/A
| TD Waterhouse Centre
| 2-0
|- align="center" bgcolor="ffbbbb"
| 3
|  May 26
|  Indiana
| L 73-80
| N/A
| N/A
| N/A
| TD Waterhouse Centre
| 2-1
|-

Regular season

|- align="center" bgcolor="ffbbbb"
| 1
|  May 31
|  @ Washington
| L 66-92
| S. Johnson (16)
| McWilliams (8)
| S. Johnson, Powell (5)
| MCI Center
| 0-1
|-

|- align="center" bgcolor="bbffbb"
| 2
|  June 1
|  Charlotte
| W 82-79
| Sales (24)
| McWilliams (9)
| S. Johnson (7)
| TD Waterhouse Centre
| 1-1
|- align="center" bgcolor="bbffbb"
| 3
|  June 3
|  @ Indiana
| W 88-82
| S. Johnson (16)
| dos Santos, McWilliams (5)
| S. Johnson (10)
| Conseco Fieldhouse
| 2-1
|- align="center" bgcolor="bbffbb"
| 4
|  June 5
|  Sacramento
| W 75-68
| Sales (22)
| McWilliams (12)
| S. Johnson (8)
| TD Waterhouse Centre
| 3-1
|- align="center" bgcolor="ffbbbb"
| 5
|  June 7
|  @ Cleveland
| L 79-83 (OT)
| Sales (24)
| McWilliams (8)
| S. Johnson (8)
| Gund Arena
| 3-2
|- align="center" bgcolor="ffbbbb"
| 6
|  June 8
|  Minnesota
| L 57-71
| McWilliams (18)
| McWilliams (9)
| S. Johnson (3)
| TD Waterhouse Centre
| 3-3
|- align="center" bgcolor="bbffbb"
| 7
|  June 10
|  @ Charlotte
| W 74-71
| McWilliams, Sales (20)
| McWilliams, dos Santos (6)
| McWilliams (6)
| Gund Arena
| 4-3
|- align="center" bgcolor="bbffbb"
| 8
|  June 13
|  @ Utah
| W 88-80
| S. Johnson (19)
| Sales (6)
| S. Johnson (12)
| Delta Center
| 5-3
|- align="center" bgcolor="ffbbbb"
| 9
|  June 15
|  @ Minnesota
| L 66-72
| Sales (23)
| dos Santos (11)
| S. Johnson (3)
| Target Center
| 5-4
|- align="center" bgcolor="ffbbbb"
| 10
|  June 17
|  Indiana
| L 54-79
| McWilliams (11)
| McWilliams (6)
| S. Johnson (4)
| TD Waterhouse Centre
| 5-5
|- align="center" bgcolor="bbffbb"
| 11
|  June 22
|  Cleveland
| W 77-64
| McWilliams (22)
| McWilliams (11)
| Five Players (3)
| TD Waterhouse Centre
| 6-5
|- align="center" bgcolor="bbffbb"
| 12
|  June 24
|  Charlotte
| W 69-68
| Sales (22)
| Sales (10)
| dos Santos (4)
| TD Waterhouse Centre
| 7-5
|- align="center" bgcolor="ffbbbb"
| 13
|  June 26
| Houston
| L 58-70
| McWilliams, Sales (14)
| S. Johnson (11)
| S. Johnson (6)
| TD Waterhouse Centre
| 7-6
|- align="center" bgcolor="bbffbb"
| 14
|  June 28
|  Miami
| W 61-53
| S. Johnson (14)
| McWilliams (8)
| S. Johnson (4)
| TD Waterhouse Centre
| 8-6
|- align="center" bgcolor="bbffbb"
| 15
|  June 30
|  @ Miami
| W 66-63
| McWilliams (17)
| McWilliams (9)
| A. Johnson (4)
| American Airlines Arena
| 9-6
|-

|- align="center" bgcolor="bbffbb"
| 16
|  July 1
|  New York
| W 69-57
| S. Johnson (23)
| S. Johnson (11)
| A. Johnson (3)
| TD Waterhouse Centre
| 10-6
|- align="center" bgcolor="bbffbb"
| 17
|  July 6
|  Indiana
| W 72-60
| McWilliams (22)
| S. Johnson (7)
| S. Johnson (4)
| TD Waterhouse Centre
| 11-6
|- align="center" bgcolor="bbffbb"
| 18
|  July 8
|  Seattle
| W 64-53
| A. Johnson (18)
| McWilliams (9)
| Powell (5)
| TD Waterhouse Centre
| 12-6
|- align="center" bgcolor="bbffbb"
| 19
|  July 9
|  @ Detroit
| W 68-62
| A. Johnson (17)
| McWilliams (11)
| S. Johnson (5)
| Palace of Auburn Hills
| 13-6
|- align="center" bgcolor="ffbbbb"
| 20
|  July 12
|  @ Cleveland
| L 72-74 (OT)
| McWilliams (22)
| McWilliams (7)
| Powell (5)
| Gund Arena
| 13-7
|- align="center" bgcolor="ffbbbb"
| 21
|  July 14
|  New York
| L 51-55
| A. Johnson (22)
| A. Johnson (10)
| S. Johnson (3)
| TD Waterhouse Centre
| 13-8
|- align="center" bgcolor="bbffbb"
| 22
|  July 19
|  Detroit
| W 88-78
| Sales (20)
| McWilliams (10)
| Sales (7)
| TD Waterhouse Centre
| 14-8
|- align="center" bgcolor="ffbbbb"
| 23
|  July 21
|  @ Washington
| L 59-61
| S. Johnson (17)
| S. Johnson (8)
| S. Johnson (5)
| MCI Center
| 14-9
|- align="center" bgcolor="ffbbbb"
| 24
|  July 23
|  Utah
| L 66-69
| A. Johnson, McWilliams (18)
| dos Santos (11)
| S. Johnson (7)
| TD Waterhouse Centre
| 14-10
|- align="center" bgcolor="ffbbbb"
| 25
|  July 25
|  @ Los Angeles
| L 63-78
| dos Santos (14)
| McWilliams (7)
| S. Johnson (6)
| Staples Center
| 14-11
|- align="center" bgcolor="ffbbbb"
| 26
|  July 27
|  @ Sacramento
| L 66-73
| Sales (25)
| S. Johnson (10)
| S. Johnson (9)
| ARCO Arena
| 14-12
|- align="center" bgcolor="ffbbbb"
| 27
|  July 30
|  @ Portland
| L 55-76
| A. Johnson (20)
| S. Johnson (8)
| S. Johnson (4)
| Rose Garden
| 14-13
|-

|- align="center" bgcolor="ffbbbb"
| 28
|  August 1
|  @ Phoenix
| L 77-84
| A. Johnson (24)
| McGhee (7)
| S. Johnson (7)
| America West Arena
| 14-14
|- align="center" bgcolor="ffbbbb"
| 29
|  August 4
|  @ New York
| L 57-70
| A. Johnson (14)
| McWilliams (14)
| S. Johnson (9)
| Madison Square Garden
| 14-15
|- align="center" bgcolor="bbffbb"
| 30
|  August 6
|  Detroit
| W 92-63
| A. Johnson (25)
| dos Santos, McWilliams (8)
| S. Johnson (9)
| TD Waterhouse Centre
| 15-15
|- align="center" bgcolor="bbffbb"
| 31
|  August 7
|  Washington
| W 65-57
| Sales (16)
| dos Santos, Sales (7)
| S. Johnson (4)
| TD Waterhouse Centre
| 16-15
|- align="center" bgcolor="ffbbbb"
| 32
|  August 9
|  @ Miami
| L 64-68 (2OT)
| McWilliams (23)
| McWilliams (13)
| S. Johnson (6)
| American Airlines Arena
| 16-16
|-

Playoffs
In the first round of the Eastern Conference Playoffs, the Miracle had to face the Cleveland Rockers. Since the Rockers had the better record, the series would be played with game 1 at Orlando, game 2 at Cleveland, and game 3 (if needed) at Cleveland. The Miracle won the first game, but the Rockers won the next two and took the series.
For the first time in franchise history, the Miracle advanced to the postseason.

|- align="center" bgcolor="bbffbb"
| 1
|  August 11
|  Cleveland
| W 62-55
| McWilliams (16)
| McWilliams (10)
| S. Johnson (5)
| TD Waterhouse Centre
| 1-0
|- align="center" bgcolor="ffbbbb"
| 2
|  August 13
|  @ Cleveland
| L 54-63
| A. Johnson (17)
| S. Johnson (9)
| S. Johnson (7)
| Gund Arena
| 1-1
|- align="center" bgcolor="ffbbbb"
| 3
|  August 15
|  @ Cleveland
| L 43-72
| Sales (13)
| McWilliams (8)
| Four Players (2)
| Gund Arena
| 1-2
|-

Player stats
http://www.wnba.com/sun/stats/2000/

Awards and honors
Shannon Johnson, Taj McWilliams-Franklin and Nykesha Sales were named to the WNBA All-Star team.
Shannon Johnson was named to the All-WNBA Second Team for the second time in her career.

References

Orlando Miracle seasons
Orlando
Orlando Miracle